Sierentz station (French: Gare de Sierentz) is a French railway station serving the commuter town of Sierentz, Haut-Rhin. The station is located between the cities of Mulhouse and  Basel.

Opened in 1840 by the Compagnie du chemin de fer de Strasbourg à Bâle, the railway station is a stop on the SNCF national network. The station is served by TER Grand Est trains between Mulhouse and Basel SBB.

History

References

Railway stations in Haut-Rhin